Trifești is a commune in Iași County, Western Moldavia, Romania. It is composed of four villages: Hermeziu, Trifești, Vladomira and Zaboloteni.

Hermeziu village was the ancestral home of the Negruzzi family.

References

Communes in Iași County
Localities in Western Moldavia
Populated places on the Prut